The Mystic River Reservation is a publicly owned nature preserve with recreational features located along the Mystic River in the towns of Winchester, Arlington, Medford, Somerville, Everett, and Chelsea in eastern Massachusetts. The reserve is part of the nearly  Mystic River watershed. It is managed by the Massachusetts Department of Conservation and Recreation.

History
The reservation was established in 1893 by the newly formed Metropolitan Parks Commission (later renamed the Metropolitan District Commission), making it one of the first official nature preserves in Massachusetts, and one of five designed by the commission in that year. Of these five, three were planned as woodland river reservations: the Mystic River Reservation, Charles River Reservation, and Neponset River Reservation. By the early 20th century, most of the land along the Mystic River in Medford, Arlington, and Somerville had become public (i.e. state-owned) land.

In 2010, the DCR unveiled a plan for restoring and preserving the reservation, called the Mystic River Master Plan. Proposed projects included a partnership between the DCR and the City of Medford to restore the Condon Shell (an outdoor amphitheater located just outside Medford Square); restoration of the Amelia Earhart Dam basin parklands; and a $3.6 million federally funded link between the reservation, the Minuteman Bikeway, and the Alewife "T" Station.  The lower parkland is being redeveloped as part of Assembly Square construction.

In 2019, the Commonwealth of Massachusetts funded a feasibility study for linking the southern end of the bicycle and pedestrian paths in the reservation (near Sullivan Square) to the Somerville Community Path, for connections to the Charles River Bicycle Path and downtown Boston.

Activities and amenities
Facilities for field sports, picnicking, cycling, and sailing are found at four riverside parks: Draw Seven Park in Somerville, Torbert MacDonald Park in Medford, the Mystic Lakes in Winchester, Arlington, and Medford, and Mary O'Malley Waterfront Park in Chelsea.

References

External links

 Mystic River Reservation Department of Conservation and Recreation 
 Mystic River Reservation Map Department of Conservation and Recreation 
 Mystic River Reservation Bike Path Map Department of Conservation and Recreation 

Nature reserves in Massachusetts
Massachusetts natural resources
Protected areas of Middlesex County, Massachusetts
Environment of Massachusetts
Protected areas of Suffolk County, Massachusetts
Winchester, Massachusetts
Arlington, Massachusetts
Medford, Massachusetts
Somerville, Massachusetts
Everett, Massachusetts
Chelsea, Massachusetts
Mystic River